Garneau may refer to:

Persons
Garneau (surname)

Places
École Secondaire Catholique Garneau, a school in Ottawa, Canada
Garneau River, a tributary of the Turgeon River in Canada
Garneau, Edmonton, a neighborhood in Edmonton, Canada
Garneau Theatre, Edmonton, Canada
Garneau–Kilpatrick House, Omaha, Nebraska